Utricularia salwinensis is a small, probably perennial, carnivorous plant that belongs to the genus Utricularia. It is endemic to China and is only known from the type location in northwestern Yunnan and two other collections in southeastern Xizang (Tibet). It was originally described by Heinrich Handel-Mazzetti in 1936.

See also 
 List of Utricularia species

References 

salwinensis
Carnivorous plants of Asia
Flora of China
Flora of Tibet
Plants described in 1936